is a private university in Himeji, Hyōgo, Japan. The predecessor of the school was founded in 1951, and it was chartered as a university in 2006.

External links
 Official website 

Educational institutions established in 1951
Private universities and colleges in Japan
Himeji University
1951 establishments in Japan
Buildings and structures in Himeji